The Jersey City Giants was the name of a high-level American minor league baseball franchise that played in Jersey City, New Jersey, as the top farm system affiliate of the New York Giants from 1937 through 1950. The Jersey City club played in the International League (Class AA 1912–1945 and Class AAA since 1946). They were commonly referred to as the Little Giants.

Jersey City hosted numerous minor league teams before and since the Giants, including 1½ seasons (from July 13, 1960, through the end of 1961) as the home of the relocated Havana Sugar Kings International League franchise; that club, a Cincinnati Reds affiliate, was nicknamed the Jersey City Jerseys and included many Cuban players who had taken the field in Havana.

The city's earliest IL team, which played from 1912–1933 (except for a four-year hiatus during the Federal League period and the outbreak of World War I), was called the Skeeters. But the Jersey Giants were a notable team because they sent several star players (including Sal Maglie, Whitey Lockman, and Monte Irvin) across the river to their Major-League namesake.

In addition, the baseball color line was broken in Jersey City's Roosevelt Stadium when Jackie Robinson of the Montreal Royals made his organized baseball debut there as a visitor on April 18, 1946. Robinson made a spectacular playing debut with four hits in five at-bats, including a home run in a game that ended with a 14-1 win for the Royals. A decade later, in 1956–1957, Roosevelt Stadium would host select Dodger home games as owner Walter O'Malley parried with public officials over a new stadium in Brooklyn. The Dodgers (and the MLB Giants) ultimately abandoned New York for California in 1958.

Although they won league titles in 1939 and 1947, the Jersey Giants usually struggled to reach .500. And, like their neighbors, the Newark Bears, they found it impossible to compete when the three New York MLB teams began mass radio and television broadcasts of their games. Jersey City's attendance plunged from 337,000 in 1947 to 63,000 in 1950. The franchise moved to Ottawa, Ontario, in 1951 and became the Ottawa Giants.

Notable former players of Jewish Descent

Morrie Arnovich – Major League Baseball All-Star outfielder
Harry Feldman - Major League Baseball pitcher
 Sid Gordon - 2x Major League Baseball All-Star
Saul Rogovin - Major League Baseball pitcher; 1951 AL ERA leader
 Goody Rosen – Major League Baseball All-Star outfielder
 Phil Weintraub - Major League Baseball first baseman and outfielder

References
Lloyd Johnson and Miles Wolff, editors. The Encyclopedia of Minor League Baseball, 1997 edition. Durham, North Carolina: Baseball America.

See also
Jersey City Skeeters

Baseball teams established in 1937
Baseball teams disestablished in 1950
Defunct International League teams
Jersey City, New Jersey
New York Giants minor league affiliates
Professional baseball teams in New Jersey
Defunct baseball teams in New Jersey
1937 establishments in New Jersey
1950 establishments in New Jersey